Lake Sterzh (Стерж) is the third largest among the Valdai Lakes in Tver Oblast of Russia. It is the first lake through which the Volga flows. The lake gives its name to the Sterzh Cross.

Lake Sterzh is oriented north to south, with one bay stretching to the east. The Volga flows in the northern part of the lake. In the south, Lake Sterzh continues as Lake Vselug. Together with Lake Vselug, Lake Peno, and Lake Volgo it forms Upper Volga Reservoir. The lake is shared between Ostashkovsky (north) and Penovsky (south) Districts of Tver Oblast.

The drainage basin of Lake Sterzh includes the northern part of Ostashkovsky District and minor areas in the northeast of Penovsky District.

References

Sterzh
LSterzh